The Housing Act 1949 was a British Act of Parliament which enabled local authorities to acquire homes for improvement or conversion with 75% Exchequer grants. It also bestowed upon local authorities a wide range of useful powers, such as to provide restaurants or canteens and laundry facilities for tenants of municipal flats and housing estates, and to sell furniture to them. The legislation also removed the restriction imposed upon local authorities by previous pieces of housing legislation which limited them to providing housing for working-class people only. The aim of this change was to allow local authorities to develop mixed estates of houses of more varied types and sizes, thereby attracting all income groups. In addition, housing improvement grants for private landlords and owner-occupiers were introduced under the Act. According to Norman Ginsburg, this piece of legislation was the first example of a "welfarist" policy in respect of owner-occupiers, as local authorities were to direct these grants towards bringing properties up to a sixteen-point standard.

See also
Welfare state
National Insurance Act 1911

Notes

United Kingdom Acts of Parliament 1949
Public housing in the United Kingdom
Housing in the United Kingdom